Hara (written 原 or はら) is a Japanese surname. Notable people with the surname include:

Hara Masatane (原 昌胤, 1531–1575), senior retainer of the Takeda clan during the late Sengoku period
Hara Nagayori (原 長頼, 1544–1600), Japanese samurai of the Sengoku through late Azuchi-Momoyama period
Hara Takashi (原 敬, 1856–1921), the 19th Prime Minister of Japan
Hara Torayoshi (原 虎吉), retainer under the Takeda clan of samurai during the late Sengoku period
Hara Toratane (原 虎胤, 1497–1564), Japanese general under Takeda Shingen
Otohiko Hara (原 乙彦, 1925–2018), Japanese businessman
Arthur S. Hara, prominent Japanese-Canadian businessman and philanthropist
Atsushi Hara (原 篤志, born 1979), Japanese professional radio-controlled car racer
Aya Hara (原 亜弥), Japanese voice actress
, Japanese model and beauty pageant winner
Burt Hara, the principal clarinetist with the Minnesota Orchestra
Chisako Hara (原 知佐子, 1936–2020), Japanese actress
Chūichi Hara (原 忠一, 1889–1964), admiral in the Imperial Japanese Navy during World War II
, Japanese freestyle skier
Eriko Hara (原 えりこ), Japanese voice actress
Fumina Hara (原 史奈, born 1981), Japanese actress and idol
George Hara Williams (1894–1945), American farmer activist and politician
Hidenori Hara (原 秀則, born 1961), Japanese manga artist
Hideroku Hara (原　秀六, born 1956), Japanese legal scholar
Hiromi Hara (原 博実, born 1958), Japanese ex-soccer player and former manager of F.C. Tokyo
Hiroshi Hara (disambiguation)
Kanesuke Hara (原 摂祐, botany abbreviation Hara, 1885–1962), Japanese botanist and mycologist
Kazuki Hara (原 一樹, born 1985), Japanese football player
Kazuko Hara (原 嘉壽子, born 1935), prolific Japanese opera composer
Kazuo Hara (原 一男), Japanese documentary film director
Keiichi Hara (原 恵一, born 1959), Japanese director of animated films
Kenya Hara (born 1958), Japanese graphic designer and curator
Kenzaburo Hara (disambiguation)
Komako Hara (1910–1968), Japanese actress
Martinho Hara (マルティノ　原, 1569-1629), Japanese nobleman of Tenshō embassy who was one of the first official Japanese emissaries to Europe.
Masafumi Hara (born 1943), retired Japanese football player
Mikie Hara (原 幹恵, born 1987), Japanese gravure idol and actress
Mikiko Hara (原 美樹子, born 1967), Japanese photographer
Naohisa Hara (原 直久, born 1946), Japanese photographer
Nobuki Hara (born 1979), former Japanese football player
Ryuta Hara (原 竜太, born 1981), retired Japanese football player
Sachie Hara (原 沙知絵, born 1978), Japanese actress and model
Saori Hara (原 紗央莉, born 1988), Japanese adult video idol, model and actress
Setsuko Hara (原 節子, 1920-2015), Japanese actress
Taira Hara (はら たいら, 1943–2006), Japanese manga artist
Tameichi Hara (原 為一, 1900–1980), Imperial Japanese naval commander during the Pacific War
Tamiki Hara (原 民喜, 1905–1951), Japanese author and survivor of the bombing of Hiroshima
Tatsunori Hara (原 辰徳, born 1958), the current manager for the Yomiuri Giants baseball team in Nippon Professional Baseball
, Japanese footballer
Tetsuo Hara (原 哲夫, born 1961), Japanese manga artist
Ville Hara (born 1974), Finnish architect
Yasuyoshi Hara (原 康義, born 1952), Japanese actor and voice actor
Yoshimichi Hara  (原 嘉道, 1867–1944, Japanese representative of Emperor Hirohito during World War II
Yuko Hara (原 由子) (born 1956), keyboard player for Southern All Stars
Yumi Hara (born 1985) Japanese voice actress
Yumiko Hara (原 裕美子, born 1982), Japanese marathon runner
Yutaka Hara (原 ゆたか), Japanese manga artist
Yutaro Hara (原 裕太郎, born 1990), Japanese football player

Fictional characters
, a character in the Assassination Classroom anime and manga
Masako Hara (原 真砂子), a character from anime and manga Ghost Hunt

Finnish surname
Marika Hara, Finnish mountain bike orienteering competitor and world champion

Indian surname
Hara is a jatt surname in northwestern India. It is found among Sikh Jats.. They are mainly land and farm owners and belong to Nandpur. Some people believe that this was a surname given to a prince himself after he left his kingdom to marry someone. He needed a new surname to remain hidden from the king.

Others
Marika Hara, Finnish mountain bike orienteering competitor and world champion

Japanese-language surnames